Baron Pentland, of Lyth in the County of Caithness, was title in the Peerage of the United Kingdom. It was created in 1909 for the Scottish Liberal politician John Sinclair. He later served as Governor of Madras. Lord Pentland was the son of Captain George Sinclair, younger son of Sir John Sinclair, 6th Baronet, of Dunbeath, a descendant of George Sinclair of Mey, third son of George Sinclair, 4th Earl of Caithness (see Sinclair Baronets and Earl of Caithness for earlier history of the family). The title became extinct on the death of his son, the second Baron, on 14 February 1984.

Barons Pentland (1909)
John Sinclair, 1st Baron Pentland (1860–1925) 
Henry John Sinclair, 2nd Baron Pentland (1907–1984)

See also
Sinclair Baronets
Earl of Caithness

References

Extinct baronies in the Peerage of the United Kingdom
Noble titles created in 1909
Noble titles created for UK MPs